Maline may refer to:

Places
Maline, Mokronog-Trebelno, a village in the Municipality of Mokronog-Trebelno, southeastern Slovenia
Maline pri Štrekljevcu, a village in the Municipality of Semič, southeastern Slovenia
Maline, Bosnia and Herzegovina, village in Bosnia and Herzegovina

People with the surname
Nicolas Maline (1822–1877), luthier and bow maker
Pierre Maline (1883–1934), luthier and bow maker

See also
Fourche Maline
Malini (disambiguation)